Frank Jacob "Deke" Gard (March 27, 1892 – September 27, 1918) was an American rugby union player who played flanker for the United States men's national team in its first two capped matches in 1912 and 1913.

Early life and university years
Gard was born on March 27, 1892 in Tremont City, Ohio, the eldest child of Emerson Earl Gard and Laura E. Gard (born Shanley). Gard moved with his family from Ohio to Glendora, California in 1905 and attended Citrus Union High School, from which he graduated in 1910. Gard attended Stanford University from 1910 until 1914 and graduated in May 1914 with a degree in chemistry. While at Stanford, Gard played for the rugby team, serving as the team's captain during the 1914 season. During his senior season, Gard was described as "one of [the] best forwards on the [West] coast." He also was a three-time varsity letter-winner for the school's track and field team, running in the 440-yard dash and in relays.

International rugby career
Beginning in 1911, Gard played for the United States national rugby union team. On November 16, 1912, Gard played for the United States at flanker in its first capped match—a 12–8 loss to Australia. On November 15, 1913, Gard also played for the United States at flanker in its first test match against New Zealand. Gard served as captain in this match—a 51–3 defeat.

Military service and death
On June 13, 1917, Gard enlisted in the United States Army. Gard was commissioned as a First Lieutenant, served in the Army's 362nd Infantry Regiment, 91st Division, and was deployed to France during World War I. On September 27, 1918, Gard was killed in action during an advance through Gesnes, France. Gard was buried at the Meuse-Argonne American Cemetery near Romagne-sous-Montfaucon in France.

References

External links

1892 births
1918 deaths
American rugby union players
United States international rugby union players
Rugby union flankers
United States Army officers
United States Army personnel of World War I
American military personnel killed in World War I